Otukile Lekote (born 19 October 1978) is a middle distance runner from Botswana who specializes in the 800 metres.

He won the bronze medal at the 2001 Summer Universiade and finished fourth at the 2002 Commonwealth Games. He also competed at the 2001 and 2003 World Championships without reaching the finals.

Achievements

Personal bests
400 metres - 46.01 s (2001) - national record is 45.34 s.
800 metres - 1:44.47 min (2001)

References

External links
 

1978 births
Living people
Botswana male middle-distance runners
Athletes (track and field) at the 2002 Commonwealth Games
Universiade medalists in athletics (track and field)
Universiade medalists for Botswana
Medalists at the 2001 Summer Universiade
Commonwealth Games competitors for Botswana